Stanisław Dulias (12 April 1939 – 17 November 2020) was a Polish politician.

Biography
Born in Zbaraż, Ukraine, he served as a member of the Sejm from 2001–2005 for Law and Justice. 

Dulias died from COVID-19 in Mysłowice, Poland, on 17 November 2020, at the age of 81.

References

1939 births
2020 deaths
Deaths from the COVID-19 pandemic in Poland
Members of the Polish Sejm 2001–2005
People from Zbarazh
People from Tarnopol Voivodeship
Polish economists